Angamuwa Grama Niladhari Division is a Grama Niladhari Division of the Padukka Divisional Secretariat of Colombo District of Western Province, Sri Lanka. It has Grama Niladhari Division Code 461A.

Arukwatta are located within, nearby or associated with Angamuwa.

Angamuwa is a surrounded by the Arukwatta South, Miriyagalla, Udumulla, Padukka and Weragala Grama Niladhari Divisions.

Demographics

Ethnicity 
The Angamuwa Grama Niladhari Division has a Sinhalese majority (99.5%). In comparison, the Padukka Divisional Secretariat (which contains the Angamuwa Grama Niladhari Division) has a Sinhalese majority (95.8%)

Religion 
The Angamuwa Grama Niladhari Division has a Buddhist majority (98.9%). In comparison, the Padukka Divisional Secretariat (which contains the Angamuwa Grama Niladhari Division) has a Buddhist majority (94.6%)

References 

Grama Niladhari Divisions of Padukka Divisional Secretariat